Achaiion or Achaeïum or Achaeum was a town in the Tenedian Peraia of the ancient Troad.

Its site is located near Hantepe, Asiatic Turkey.

References

Populated places in ancient Troad
Former populated places in Turkey